"One Good Woman" is a popular song from 1988 by Peter Cetera, formerly the lead singer of the rock band Chicago. Cetera co-wrote and co-produced the track with Patrick Leonard, and the song was included on Cetera's 1988 album One More Story.

Background
The song was originally written for the Tom Hanks film Big, Peter Cetera was shocked that the song was not chosen to be included in the soundtrack. In fact, Cetera later stated that the lyrics reflected the story line of the movie.  The Billboard Book of #1 Adult Contemporary Hits (Billboard Publications), page 338.</ref> Instead, it became the lead single from his One More Story album and reached No. 4 on the Billboard Hot 100 chart in October 1988. It also spent four weeks atop the Billboard adult contemporary chart, holding Taylor Dayne's "I'll Always Love You" off that top spot for the last two of them. ("I'll Always Love You" would beat "One Good Woman"'s peak on the Hot 100 by one position, reaching #3).

Personnel
 Peter Cetera – lead and backing vocals
 Patrick Leonard – acoustic piano, synthesizers
 Dann Huff – guitar
 John Robinson – drums

Charts

Year-end charts

See also
List of RPM number-one singles of 1988
List of Hot Adult Contemporary number ones of 1988

References

External links
U.S. 7" single release info Discogs

1988 singles
Peter Cetera songs
Songs written by Peter Cetera
Songs written by Patrick Leonard
RPM Top Singles number-one singles
Full Moon Records singles
1988 songs